"No Lie" is a song by Jamaican rapper and Dancehall Sean Paul that features English-Albanian singer Dua Lipa, from the former's first EP, Mad Love the Prequel (2018). The song was written by Paul, Andrew Jackson, Emily Warren, Sermstyle, and Pip Kembo. Production and co-production were handled by Sermstyle and Kembo, respectively. It was released through Island Records on 18 November 2016 as the lead single from the EP. The song was later included on Dua Lipa: Complete Edition (2018), the super deluxe reissue of Lipa's eponymous debut studio album.

"No Lie" is an R&B-tinged reggae and tropical pop song, with the lyrics seeing Paul express his attraction to a girl in a club scene. Several music critics praised Lipa's vocal performance and the party-like qualities shown throughout the song. It became a successful single in Europe, entering the top 10 of the charts in 7 countries across the continent, including the UK Singles Chart, becoming Paul's 12th and Lipa's first top 10 single in the United Kingdom. The song has since been certified gold or higher in eight different territories, including Italy, where it holds a quadruple platinum certification, and the UK, having received a platinum certification in the country.

"No Lie" was accompanied by a music video, released in January 2017 that was directed by Tim Nackashi. It features Paul and Lipa dancing in several different mirrored rooms and halls. The two promoted the song with numerous live performances, including performing it at BBC Radio 1's Big Weekend, as well as Capital FM's Jingle Bell Ball and Summertime Ball. Remixes of the song by Sam Feldt and Delirious & Alex K, respectively, have been released.

Background and composition

"No Lie" was written by Sean Paul alongside Andrew Jackson, Emily Warren, its producer Sermstyle, and co-producer Pip Kembo. Paul had been doing many writing camps at the time of writing. Sermstyle originally played the rhythm for Paul, after which he expressed his admiration of it. He wrote onto the rhythm and recorded a demo for it, with Warren singing the hook vocals on the demo, which she wrote. At the time, Paul could not imagine anyone else singing the hook. However, his management thought they should search for another vocalist and someone in the management group suggested Dua Lipa, which led to her also recoding a demo of the song. After hearing the demo, Paul immediately fell in love with Lipa's voice and went on to finish the song with her vocals. Engineering was handled by Paul Bailey, while James Royo was responsible for mixing, and the song was mastered by Barry Grint at Alchemy Mastering in London.

Musically, "No Lie" is an R&B-tinged, reggae and tropical pop track, that runs for 3:41. The production makes use of a keyboard and beats, while the opening chords give off sensuality. The song starts somewhat moody, before Lipa handles the chorus. Paul uses dancehall-like rapping and singing with a vocal rhythm, while Lipa's vocals were described as "deep" and "sultry" with a reggae-tinged accent. Lyrically, the song is about having fun in a club scene. Paul comments on the physique of a woman and his attraction to her, eventually expressing to the woman what he can do for her. The title "No Lie" comes from a saying in Jamaica that is said when you want someone to believe you.

Release and promotion
Paul announced the release of "No Lie" two days prior to its release, alongside sharing a 15-second preview of the song with both his and Lipa's vocals. The song was released for digital download and streaming through Island Records as a single on 18 November 2016. On 13 January 2017, the song was released on a CD single in Germany, with Paul's single "Tek Weh Yuh Heart" that features Tory Lanez as the B-side. "No Lie" was serviced to rhythmic contemporary and contemporary hit radio stations in the United States on 17 January 2017. It was sent for radio airplay in Italy three days later. Remixes by Sam Feldt and Delirious & Alex K were released on 27 January 2017. The song serves as the lead single and closing track from Paul's debut EP Mad Love the Prequel, released 29 June 2018. It was later included as the seventh track on the second disc of the reissue of Lipa's eponymous debut studio album Dua Lipa: Complete Edition, released on 19 October 2018. "No Lie" was included on the soundtrack to the film Baywatch (2017), as well as in the opening credits of Code Black Season 3, Episode 11: "One of Our Own", in 2018.

The music video for "No Lie" was directed by Tim Nackashi and released on 10 January 2017. It was filmed at West London's Sunbeam studios in the third studio, as well as the garden. The visual showcases Paul and Lipa dancing in an assortment of mirrored rooms and halls, with Paul wearing several different parkas. Critics viewed the video as stylish, hypnotic, and dizzying. In April 2022, the video surpassed one billion views on YouTube. "No Lie" was promoted with several live performances. Paul and Lipa performed the song for the first time on 3 December 2016 at the Jingle Bell Ball for Capital FM. On 27 May, the two performed it at BBC Radio 1 Big Weekend for 2017, and Lipa also performed a solo version of the song as a medley with her track "Dreams" (2017) at the same event. Paul and Lipa performed the song for the final time together at the Summertime Ball for Capital FM 2017, while the song was included on Paul's 2017 Pinkpop Festival, 2017 RNB Fridays Live, and Glastonbury Festival 2019 setlists, as well as Lipa's setlist at Capital FM's Jingle Bell Ball 2017. The song was also included on the setlists of Lipa's Self-Titled Tour (2017–18), for which she occasionally performed it as a medley with "Dreams". Both Lipa and Paul have a little reunion to performance at the 2018 UEFA Champions League Final in Kyiv, Ukraine.

Reception
For Billboard, Kat Bein named the song a "totally replay-able [...] party jam," as well as calling it "real sexy" and the hook "rump-shaking." In her review for V, Mariana Fernandez viewed the song as an "impressive morph of dancehall, reggae, and pop," while also praising the "infectious combination" of Paul and Lipa's vocals. Robbie Daw of Idolator thought the song is "quite a jam," and "a step in the right direction" for Paul. He went on to compliment Paul's choice of Lipa as a featured artist, and noted how she mirrors the melody of "Puttin' On the Ritz" (1929) by Irving Berlin. The staff of Much named the song "an instant addition to your weekend playlist." HotNewHipHops Danny Schwartz thought it would be commercially successful on the radio. The Singles Jukebox staff gave the song a rating of 4.25/10, with many complimenting Lipa's performance, but many criticizing how Paul was stuck in the past. In April 2020, Christopher Rosa of Glamour ranked "No Lie" as Lipa's fourth worst song, stating it is "just off."

"No Lie" became a successful single in Europe. In the United Kingdom, the song debuted at number 53 on the UK Singles Chart dated 23 November 2016. The song lasted for 30 weeks on the chart, and reached a peak of number 10 in its 11th week, becoming Paul's 12th and Lipa's first UK top 10 single. In February 2022, the song was certified double platinum by the British Phonographic Industry (BPI) for track-equivalent sales of 1,200,000 units in the UK.  The song entered the top 10 of the charts in Bulgaria, CIS, Czech Republic, Germany, Hungary, India, Italy, the Netherlands, Romania and Scotland. It was certified platinum in Germany and the Netherlands by the Bundesverband Musikindustrie (BVMI) and the Nederlandse Vereniging van Producenten en Importeurs van beeld – en geluidsdragers (NVPI), respectively as well as diamond in France by the Syndicat National de l'Édition Phonographique (SNEP). In Italy, the song reached number 11 on the FIMI Singles Chart, and was certified quadruple platinum by the Federazione Industria Musicale Italiana (FIMI) for 200,000 track-equivalent sales in the country. Outside of Europe, it reached number 43 and 45 in Venezuela and Columbia, respectively, as well as charting at number 20 on the Hot Canadian Digital Songs chart, and number 27 on the Mexico Airplay chart.

Music Video 
The music video for "No Lie" was directed by Tim Nackashi and released on 10 January 2017. It was filmed at West London's Sunbeam studios in the third studio, as well as the garden. The visual showcases Paul and Lipa dancing in an assortment of mirrored rooms and halls, with Paul wearing several different parkas. Critics viewed the video as stylish, hypnotic, and dizzying. In April 2022, the video surpassed one billion views on YouTube.

Track listings
Digital download and streaming
"No Lie" (featuring Dua Lipa) – 3:41

CD single
"No Lie" (featuring Dua Lipa) – 3:41
"Tek Weh Yuh Heart" (featuring Tory Lanez) – 3:46

Digital download and streaming – remixes
"No Lie" (featuring Dua Lipa) [Sam Feldt remix] – 2:52
"No Lie" (featuring Dua Lipa) [Delirous & Alex K remix] – 4:18

Personnel
 Sean Paul vocals
 Dua Lipa vocals
 Sermstyle production
 Pip Kembo co-production
 James Royo mixing
 Paul Bailey engineering
 Barry Grint mastering

Charts

Weekly charts

Year-end charts

Certifications

Release history

See also
 
 List of UK top-ten singles in 2017
 List of top 10 singles in 2017 (Germany)
 List of Platinum singles in the United Kingdom awarded since 2000
 List of most-viewed YouTube videos

Footnotes

References

External links
 
 
 Lyrics of this song at MetroLyrics

2016 singles
Dua Lipa songs
Sean Paul songs
Island Records singles
Songs written by Sean Paul
Songs written by Emily Warren
2016 songs
Songs written by Sermstyle